Mount House was a coeducational independent school situated in the outskirts of Tavistock, Devon; there was an associated preparatory school for primary school children. In June 2014, the school formally merged with Kelly College to form Mount Kelly School.

The school had fifty acres, including playing fields, set on the edge of Dartmoor and including a stretch of the River Tavy.

History 
Mount House School was founded in 1881 by Miss Parker and Miss Tubbs at Alton House, Tavistock Hill, Plymouth. In 1890 the school moved location to North Hill, Plymouth (now the site of St Matthias church hall), moving in 1900 to larger premises at Mount House, Approach Road, Plymouth (Tubbs's birthplace). Plymouth was heavily bombed in World War II and the school re-located to a 50-acre site at Mount Tavy in 1940. The school became a charitable trust in 1984, becoming co-educational in 1996 with a pre-prep established for 3 to 7-year-olds.

Facilities 
Facilities that were available at Mount House:-

 All-weather pitch
 6 grass pitches for rugby, football, cricket and rounders
 700 square metre indoor sports hall
 2 squash courts
 Out door cricket nets
 3 cross country courses
 Netball court
 Tennis court
 9 hole golf course
 25m heated outdoor swimming pool
 Theatre
 Boating lake

Notable former pupils
 William Child Villiers, 10th Earl of Jersey, film and TV producer
 Ed Bye, film and TV producer and director
 Philip de Glanville, former England Rugby captain
 Christopher Hitchens, journalist
 Peter Hitchens, author and writer
 Lord David Owen, former Foreign Secretary and Leader of the SDP
 Lewis Pugh, endurance swimmer and ocean advocate
 David Somerset, chief cashier, Bank of England
 Paul Tyler, Liberal Democrat MP for Bodmin

References

Defunct schools in Devon
Educational institutions established in 1881
Educational institutions disestablished in 2014
Boarding schools in Devon
Tavistock
1881 establishments in England
2014 disestablishments in England